Brit Awards 1982 was the second event of the Brit Awards, an annual pop music award ceremony in the United Kingdom. It was organised by the British Phonographic Industry and took place on 4 February 1982 at Grosvenor House Hotel in London. The host was David Jacobs.

Winners and nominees

Multiple nominations and awards
The following artists received multiple awards and/or nominations.

References

External links
Brit Awards 1982 at Brits.co.uk

Brit Awards
Brit Awards
BRIT Awards
BRIT Awards
Brit Awards
Brit Awards